Yvonne Okwara Matole is a Kenyan television journalist working for Citizen TV. She is an award winning Journalist. She has 13 years experience of in radio and television.

Biography 
Okwara was born on March 16, 1983, in Nairobi, Kenya. She is an alumnus of Kianda High School. She holds an BSc in Microbiology from the Jomo Kenyatta University of Agriculture and Technology. She is a graduate of the Bloomberg/ Africa Leadership Initiative Media fellowship.

Okwara's first job in media was at KBC she was doing a children’s show. She was hired by radio station, Hot 96FM. She later joined the Nation group through QFM, QTV. She was hired by Kenya Television Network (KTN).

Personal life 
She is married to Andrew Matole, who is a veterinary surgeon.

References 

Kenyan women journalists
Kenyan television journalists
Kenyan radio journalists
Kenyan women radio journalists
Kenyan women television journalists
Living people
Year of birth missing (living people)
Jomo Kenyatta University of Agriculture and Technology alumni